Stibb Cross is a small village in north Devon, England. It is included in the civil parish of Langtree and is located about one mile from that village. Its population in 2001 was 677.

The word stibb is derived from Old English styb, which referred to a weapon made of wood.

External links

 Local motorcycle club

The Union Inn is the village pub. There are two new housing estates.

Villages in Devon
Torridge District